Yakup Bey (1437 – September 1442) was the sanjak-bey of Albania in 1437 (during the revolt staged by his father, Teodor III Muzaka), replaced by Hadım Şehabeddin (sanjak-bey until 1439), then served again in 1441–42, until September 1442 when he was killed in action along with several other sanjak-beys under the command of Hadım Şehabeddin (since 1439 the beylerbey of the Rumelia Eyalet) at the battle near the Ialomița River against Christian forces under Janos Hunyadi.

References

15th-century Albanian people
15th-century people from the Ottoman Empire
Ottoman Albanian nobility
Governors of the Ottoman Empire
Military personnel of the Ottoman Empire
1442 deaths
Muzaka family